Maksim Vladimirovich Yermakov (born 21 April 1995) is a Russian footballer.

Career

Club
Yermakov made his debut in the Russian Professional Football League for FC Spartak-2 Moscow on 30 July 2013 in a game against FC Vityaz Podolsk. Yermakov left FC Pyunik at the start of the winter break during the 2017–18 season.

Career statistics

Club

References

External links
 
 Profile at Crimean Football Union

1995 births
Living people
People from Kamensk-Uralsky
Russian footballers
Association football midfielders
Russian expatriate footballers
Expatriate footballers in Lithuania
Expatriate footballers in Armenia
Expatriate footballers in Belarus
Russian expatriate sportspeople in Lithuania
A Lyga players
FC Spartak Moscow players
FC Spartak-2 Moscow players
FC Krasnodar players
FC Stumbras players
FC Pyunik players
FC Noah players
FC Isloch Minsk Raion players
FC Mashuk-KMV Pyatigorsk players
Sportspeople from Sverdlovsk Oblast